Quimper–Bretagne Airport , formerly known as Quimper–Cornouaille Airport and Quimper–Pluguffan Airport, is an airport located in Pluguffan and 5.5 km southwest of Quimper, both communes of the Finistère department in the Brittany region of France.

Airlines and destinations 
The following airlines operate regular scheduled and charter flights at Quimper–Cornouaille Airport:

Statistics

References

External links 

 Quimper–Bretagne Airport (official site)
 
 

Airports in Brittany
Buildings and structures in Finistère
Quimper